(born January 1, 1936) is a Japanese educator and Academian. He is the Founder/Chairman of Kobe Denshi and Graduate School of Information Technology (KIC).

Early life
Tomio Fukuoka was born in Kagawa Prefecture, Japan.

Professional career
Tomio Fukuoka founded KIC in 1958 as a small Electronic school in the city of Kobe, Japan was called Kobe Electronic School, which received the recognition Institute of Advanced Vocational Education from the Japanese Ministry of Education in 1988 for its vital contribution to Japanese computing society. Now KIC is one of the major institutes for professional, vocational, practical oriented education in ICT and other Digital related industries in Japan over 17,700 alumni.

Awards and honors 
 Medal with Blue Ribbon
Awarded for significant achievements in the areas of public welfare and public service by the Government of Japan in 1993.
 Order of the Sacred Treasure (GOLD AND SILVER RAYS)
Awarded for distinguished achievements in research fields, social work, state/local government fields or the improvement of life for handicapped/impaired persons by the Emperor of Japan in 2008.

Publication 
  C3055

See also 
Kobe Institute of Computing
Kobe Denshi

References

External links 
神戸電子専門学校60年の歩み
A History of KIC
日本の勲章・褒章/勲章の種類及び授与対象/勲章の種類（瑞宝章） - 内閣府
日本の勲章・褒章 - 内閣府

1936 births
Japanese educators
Living people
Recipients of the Order of the Sacred Treasure, 2nd class
Recipients of the Medal of Honor (Japan)
People from Kagawa Prefecture
Recipients of Japanese civil awards and decorations